Cloverdale is a community in the Canadian province of New Brunswick located around the intersection of Route 104 and Route 575. It is situated in Brighton, a parish of Carleton County.  Settlement dated from 1866.  Name possibly descriptive.

History

See also
List of communities in New Brunswick

References

Communities in Carleton County, New Brunswick